The Australian hard rock band, the Angels, have released thirteen studio albums, four live albums, eight  extended plays and forty-five singles. The Angels were formed in Adelaide in 1974 by the Brewster brothers, John and Rick, together with Bernard "Doc" Neeson. The line-up of the band has since gone through numerous changes with Rick as the mainstay member. They are known as Angel City internationally (to avoid confusion with 70s glam-rock band Angel.)

At the ARIA Music Awards of 1998 The Angels were inducted into the ARIA Hall of Fame.

Albums

Studio albums

Live albums

Compilation albums

Extended plays

Singles

Video albums

Other appearances

Notes

References

General

 
  Note: Archived [on-line] copy has limited functionality.

Specific

External links
 
 

Discographies of Australian artists
Discography
Rock music group discographies